Tivaouane or Tivawan is a city located in the Thiès Region of Senegal.

History
Tivaouane was part of the Wolof kingdom of Cayor, and was at one time its capital. It was first described to Europeans in the 15th century by Venetian explorer Luigi Cada-Mosto.

In 1904, it was the fifth largest city in Sénégal after Saint-Louis, Dakar, Rufisque and Gorée.

It is also one of the sacred places of the Tijaniyya Sufi brotherhood. Each week, followers come to visit the tombs of religious leaders, especially that of El-Hadji Malick Sy. Visitors flock each year to celebrate the birth of the prophet Muhammad in a festival called the Maouloud (or Gamou, in Wolof, a word borrowed from one of the Serer religious festivals).

The influence of the Muslim brotherhoods of Senegal helps to explain the dramatic demographic growth of the city, which had a population of less than 7900 in 1960.

In 2022, the recently inaugurated  Hospital in Tivaouane caught fire due to a short circuit. The neonatal department burned down to the ground, with 11 newborn babies dead.

Administration
Tivaouane is the capital of the Tivaouane Department in the région de Thiès.

Geography
Tivaouane is a regional transport hub, where the route nationale n° 2 connecting Dakar and Saint-Louis passes near Thiès.

The nearest small towns are Yendam, Keur Massamba Daguene, Selko, Ndiagane, Keur Assane,  et Sintiou Pir.

Population
Between the censuses of 1988 and 2002, Tivaouane grew from 27,117 to 38,213 inhabitants.

In 2007, according to official estimates, the population has grown to 39,766, which makes it the 15th largest city in Senegal.

Wolofs are the largest ethnic group in the area.

Economy
Tivaouane is in an agricultural region, at the heart of the bassin arachidier of Arachide oil (Peanut oil) production.

Catering to religious gatherings and celebrations also plays a great role in the economy.

See also

Bibliography
 Translation of Fr:Wikipedia Article.
 Aboubacar Diaw Seydi, L’évolution de la population de Tivaouane depuis le début du siècle, Dakar, Université de Dakar, 1988, 3 + 94 p. + 8 p. (Mémoire de Maîtrise de géographie)
 Cheikh Tidiane Fall, El Hadji Malick Sy à Tivaouane de 1902 à 1922, Dakar, Université de Dakar, 1986, 92 p. (Mémoire de Maîtrise)

Notes

External links
 Maps, weather and airports for Tivaouane
 Site du CEM Ababacar Sy (Collège d'enseignement moyen de Tivaouane)

Populated places in Thiès Region
Communes of Senegal